Fimbristylis acicularis is a sedge of the family Cyperaceae that is native to northern and north eastern Australia.

Description
It blooms between April and July and produces green flowers.

Taxonomy
The species was first described by the botanist Robert Brown in 1810 as part of the work Prodromus florae Novae Hollandiae et insulae Van-Diemen, exhibens characteres plantarum quas annis. There are many synonyms including; Scirpus acicularis, Fimbristylis australica, Isolepis cochleata, Abildgaardia brevifolia, Iriha acicularia, Fimbristylis setacea and Iria acicularia.
The specific epithet, is derived from Latin and means "needle-shaped".

Distribution
In Western Australia it is found in coastal areas of the Kimberley region situated in swamps and along creeks and in other damp areas with its range extending across coastal regions of the top end of the Northern Territory and coastal areas of Queensland.

References 

Plants described in 1810
Flora of Western Australia
Acicularis
Taxa named by Robert Brown (botanist, born 1773)
Endemic flora of Australia